The Estate Agents Ombudsman is an Ombudsman in the United Kingdom who handles complaints against estate agents.

References 

Ombudsmen in the United Kingdom